Nietneria is a genus of plants in the Nartheciaceae. It has two known species, both native to northern South America.

Species
The genus contains the following species:

 Nietneria corymbosa Klotzsch & M.R.Schomb. ex B.D.Jacks. - Guyana, Amazonas + Bolívar States in Venezuela
 Nietneria paniculata Steyerm. - Bolívar State in Venezuela, Guyana, Serra Aracá in the Brazilian State of Amazonas

References

Nartheciaceae